Charlemont Bridge is a stone bridge in Moy, County Tyrone, Northern Ireland

The bridge spans the River Blackwater connecting the villages of Moy and Charlemont (on the east bank) on the old coaching route between Dungannon and Armagh. It is a triple-arched stone bridge constructed in 1855 by William Dargan, who was also responsible for the Portadown to Dungannon section of the Ulster Railway.

References

Railway bridges in Northern Ireland
Buildings and structures in County Tyrone
Bridges completed in 1855
Grade B1 listed buildings